Thomas Ritchie (born about 1928 – ????) was a psychiatric survivor who founded the Scottish Union of Mental Patients whilst a state patient incarcerated in Hartwood Hospital  in 1971.

References

Psychiatric survivor activists